Thomas Cobham (died 1327) was an English churchman.

Thomas Cobham may also refer to:

Thomas Cobham (MP) (c. 1343–1394), MP for Kent, also known as Thomas Cobham, 3rd Baron Cobham, English nobleman and politician
Thomas Cobham, 5th Baron Cobham (died 1471), English nobleman

Thomas Brooke alias Cobham (1533–1578), MP for Rochester

Thomas Cobham (actor) (1786–1842), British actor